SESAR European Airports Consortium is a member in the European public-private partnership that is managing the development phase of the Single European Sky ATM Research (SESAR) Programme .

Overview 
SEAC aims at participation in the SESAR project thus developing the future airport systems according to the ATM master plan.

Legal basis 
A consortium agreement defines how these close competitors will work together under the SESAR project.

Funding and budget 
SEAC is taking part in the 700M€ industrial share of the SJU PPP.

Members 
The members of the SEAC Consortium are:
 Aéroports de Paris ADP
 BAA Airports Ltd
 Flughafen München GmbH
 Fraport AG
 Schiphol Nederland B.V.
 Flughafen Zurich AG
 Avinor AS

References

External links 
 SEAC
 SESAR JU web site
 SESAR
 Description of the SESAR Work Packages
 EUROCONTROL

Air traffic control in Europe
Air traffic control organizations
International aviation organizations